Enzo Artoni and Fernando Vicente were the defending champions.  Artoni partnered with Marcin Matkowski this year, losing in the quarterfinals.  Vicente did not participate.

František Čermák and Leoš Friedl won in the final 6–4, 6–3, against Martín García and Luis Horna.

Seeds

Draw

Draw

External links
Draw

2005 ATP Tour
2005 Grand Prix Hassan II